The One Hundred Tenth United States Congress was the meeting of the legislative branch of the United States federal government, between January 3, 2007, and January 3, 2009, during the last two years of the second term of President George W. Bush. It was composed of the Senate and the House of Representatives. The apportionment of seats in the House was based on the 2000 U.S. census.

The Democratic Party controlled a majority in both chambers for the first time since the end of the 103rd Congress in 1995. Although the Democrats held fewer than 50 Senate seats, they had an operational majority because the two independent senators caucused with the Democrats for organizational purposes. No Democratic-held seats had fallen to the Republican Party in the 2006 elections. Democrat Nancy Pelosi became the first woman Speaker of the House. The House also received the first Muslims and Buddhists in Congress.

Demographics

Senate

House of Representatives

Overview

Voting members by state

Delegates

Notes
John Barrasso was appointed by Wyoming Governor Dave Freudenthal on June 25, 2007, after Craig L. Thomas died on June 4, 2007.
Laura Richardson replaced Juanita Millender-McDonald, who died on April 22, 2007, on August 21, 2007, after a special election.
Paul Broun replaced Charlie Norwood, who died on February 3, 2007, on July 25, 2007, after a special election.
Dennis Hastert resigned November 26, 2007, and was replaced by a special election by Bill Foster.
Niki Tsongas replaced Marty Meehan who resigned on July 7, 2007, on October 18, 2007, after a special election.
Julia Carson died on December 15, 2007, and was replaced by a special election by André Carson.
Bob Latta replaced Paul Gillmor, who died on September 5, 2007, on December 13, 2007, after a special election.
Rob Wittman replaced Jo Ann Davis, who died on October 6, 2007, on December 13, 2007, after a special election.
Trent Lott resigned from his Senate seat on December 18, 2007. Mississippi Governor Haley Barbour appointed Congressman Roger Wicker on December 31, 2007, to replace him. Wicker was replaced by Travis Childers after a special election.
Bobby Jindal resigned January 14, 2008, and was replaced by Steve Scalise after a special election.
Richard Baker resigned on February 2, 2008, and was replaced by Don Cazayoux after a special election.
Tom Lantos died on February 11, 2008, and was replaced by Jackie Speier after a special election.
Stephanie Tubbs Jones died on August 10, 2008, and was replaced by Marcia Fudge after a special election.
Thomas M. Davis resigned on November 24, 2008.

See also
United States general elections, 2006
United States Senate elections, 2006
United States House election, 2006

References

Sources
Hispanic Americans in Congress
This Nation